= Kanotala =

Town of ancient Cappadocia

Coordinates: 38°18′05″N 34°20′48″E

Kanotala was a town of ancient Cappadocia, inhabited in Byzantine times.

Its site is located near Ayaşlı, Asiatic Turkey.
